Bernard Brand "Bud" Konheim (March 25, 1935 – April 13, 2019) was an American businessman. He was the co-founder and chief executive officer of Nicole Miller, a fashion company.

Early life
Bud Konheim was educated at Phillips Exeter Academy. He graduated from Dartmouth College and served in the Marines.

Career
Konheim co-founded Nicole Miller, a fashion company. He served as its chief executive officer.

Personal life
Konheim's son Eric died in a kayaking accident in 1991.

in 2015, Konheim made major gifts to Rocky Mountain Institute (in honor of his son Eric) and Puppies Behind Bars (to aid returning veterans with PTSD). He also donated money in support of student scholarships at Phillips Exeter Academy and Dartmouth College.

Konheim died from injuries sustained from falling off of his bicycle on April 13, 2019.

References

1935 births
2019 deaths
Accidental deaths in Connecticut
American chief executives
American company founders
American fashion businesspeople
Businesspeople from New York City
Dartmouth College alumni
Phillips Exeter Academy alumni
United States Marines
20th-century American businesspeople